Eagland Hill is a rural hamlet in the civil parish of Pilling, in the county of Lancashire, England. It lies in a part of the Fylde, west of Garstang, known locally as Over Wyre. The church, dedicated to St Mark, dates from 1870. The area attracts many bird-watchers, due to the number of rare birds.

St Mark's Church
The church's foundation stone was laid, on 13 August 1869, by co-founder James Jenkinson and the church was opened on St Mark's Day, 20 April, in the following year. Jenkinson's cottage was the first house to be built in the village, in 1814, and the church altar is located where the cottage fireplace once stood. The church does not have a graveyard.

The family history of James Jenkinson has been extensively researched. "Owd Jemmy" was born in 1786 in Kirkland. He married Ellen Fisher on 6 June 1808, at St Helen's Church, Churchtown, and with her had fourteen children. He died in 1874 at Birks Farm, Eagland Hill, and was buried at St John the Baptist's Church, Pilling.

Next to the church is the church hall which still has, in use, a Victorian letter-box.

Brook Farm Airfield
Its two grass runways are 07/25, and 09/27, .

References

External links

Villages in Lancashire
Pilling
The Fylde